St. Joseph County is a county located in the U.S. state of Michigan, on the central southern border with Indiana. As of the 2020 United States Census, the population was 60,939. The county seat is Centreville.

French colonists in the late 17th century were the first Europeans to explore this territory, and they named the St. Joseph River for the patron saint of New France. This area was not part of the United States until after the American Revolutionary War. After the 1821 Treaty of Chicago was signed, regional tribes of the indigenous peoples ceded much land to the United States, opening the area for American settlement. The county was set off and organized by the Michigan Territory legislature in 1829; it was named for the river.

The area is home to the oldest and largest Amish community in Michigan.

St. Joseph County comprises the Sturgis, MI Micropolitan Statistical Area and is included in the Kalamazoo-Battle Creek-Portage, MI Combined Statistical Area.

History
This area was settled by members of the three Algonquian-speaking tribes of the Council of Three Fires: the Potawatomi, Odawa, and Chippewa (known as Ojibwa in Canada). French explorers in a party led by Father Hennepin came upriver from Lake Michigan in 1679. A Jesuit mission was established near where the French later built Fort St. Joseph, and they named the waterway as the St. Joseph River.

After the United States and tribal representatives made the 1821 Treaty of Chicago, much of the land in this region was ceded by the tribes to Michigan Territory, so more settlers came from Detroit, Monroe and later from New England and upstate New York. The first were ethnic French. The Godfroy brothers of Detroit built a trading post south of the river, near the later Marantette House site. They appointed Frances Mouton as an agent to trade with the natives of the Nottawaseepe (sippi) settlement. They had another post nearby where Patrick Marantette, also from Detroit, first worked as an agent. He ended up settling in and marrying Mouton's daughter Francis. Theirs was the first marriage in the settlement, and their daughter the first European American born here, in 1836.

Geography
It is the fourth-smallest county in Michigan by total area. The entire county lies in the Saint Joseph River watershed.

Adjacent counties

Van Buren County – northwest
Kalamazoo County – north
Calhoun County – northeast
Branch County – east
LaGrange County, Indiana – south
Elkhart County, Indiana – southwest
Cass County – west

Major highways
 – runs east–west across lower portion of the county. Passes White Pigeon and Sturgis.
 – runs north–south through the western portion of the county. Passes Three Rivers, Constantine, White Pigeon.
 – runs north–south through eastern Three Rivers - length 1.6 mile (2.6 km).
 – runs ENE through the upper portion of the county. Passes Three Rivers, Parkville, Mendon, Leonidas.
 – enters SE portion of county from Star Mill, Indiana. Runs north to intersection with M60, two miles (3 km) east of Mendon.
 – runs east–west through center of the county. Enters at Colon, passes Nella and Centreville to intersection with M60 at Three Rivers.
 – enters SW tip of county; runs north 2 miles (3 km) to intersection with US12 near west county line.
 – enters NW portion of county from Marcellus. Runs east to intersection with US131 four miles (6 km)north of Three Rivers.

Strictly speaking, the Indiana Toll Road  does not enter St. Joseph County, Michigan, but it has an interchanges with US 131 barely within Indiana. Although M-66 does not quite reach the Toll Road, the toll road interchange is in clear sight from M-66 before it becomes Indiana State Highway 9.

Demographics

The 2010 census indicates St. Joseph County had a 2010 population of 61,295. This decrease of -1,127 people from the 2000 United States Census represents a -1.8% population change (decrease) in that decade. In 2010 there were 23,244 households and 16,275 families in the county. The population density was 122.4 per square mile (47.3 square kilometers). There were 27,778 housing units at an average density of 55.5 per square mile (21.4 per km2). The racial and ethnic makeup of the county was 88.0% White, 2.5% Black or African American, 0.4% Native American, 0.7% Asian, 6.6% Hispanic or Latino, 0.1% from other races, and 1.8% from two or more races.

There were 23,244 households, out of which 33.0% had children under the age of 18 living with them, 52.6% were husband and wife families, 11.7% had a female householder with no husband present, 30.0% were non-families, and 24.8% were made up of individuals. The average household size was 2.60 and the average family size was 3.08.

The county population contained 25.9% under age of 18, 8.1% from 18 to 24, 23.8% from 25 to 44, 27.4% from 45 to 64, and 14.9% who were 65 years of age or older. The median age was 39 years. For every 100 females there were 97.9 males. For every 100 females age 18 and over, there were 95.9 males.

The 2010 American Community Survey 3-year estimate indicates the median income for a household in the county was $43,964 and the median income for a family was $52,600. Males had a median income of $30,517 versus $16,388 for females. The per capita income for the county was $19,737. About 1.8% of families and 16.3% of the population were below the poverty line, including 22.3% of those under the age 18 and 12.3% of those age 65 or over.

Government
St. Joseph County has long been reliably Republican. Since 1884, the Republican Party nominee has carried 79% of the elections (27 of 34).

The county government operates the jail, operates the major local courts, records deeds, mortgages, and vital records, administers
public health regulations, and participates with the state in the provision of social services. The county board of commissioners controls the and has limited authority to make laws or ordinances. In Michigan, most local government functions – police and fire, building and zoning, tax assessment, street maintenance, etc. – are the responsibility of individual cities and townships.

Elected officials

 1st District Commissioner: Allen Balog
 2nd District Commissioner: Kathy Pangle
 3rd District Commissioner: Dennis Allen
 4th District Commissioner: Daniel Czajkowski
 5th District Commissioner: Ken Malone
 Prosecuting Attorney: David Marvin
 Sheriff: Bradley Balk
 County Clerk/Register of Deeds: Lindsay Oswald
 County Treasurer: Judith Ratering
 Drain Commissioner: Jeffrey Wenzel
 County Surveyor: David Mostrom
 45th Circuit Court Judge: Paul Stutesman
 3B District Court Judge: Robert Pattison
 3B District Court Judge: Jeffrey Middleton
 Probate Court Judge: David Tomlinson

(Information current as of July 2019)

Communities

Cities
Sturgis
Three Rivers

Villages

Burr Oak
Centreville (county seat)
Colon
Constantine
Mendon
White Pigeon

Unincorporated communities

Findley
Leonidas
Mottville
Nottawa
Parkville
Wasepi

Townships

Burr Oak Township
Colon Township
Constantine Township
Fabius Township
Fawn River Township
Florence Township
Flowerfield Township
Leonidas Township
Lockport Township
Mendon Township
Mottville Township
Nottawa Township
Park Township
Sherman Township
Sturgis Township
White Pigeon Township

See also
List of Michigan State Historic Sites in St. Joseph County, Michigan
National Register of Historic Places listings in St. Joseph County, Michigan

References

External links
St. Joseph County website

 
Saint Joseph County
1829 establishments in Michigan Territory
Populated places established in 1829